The Dean of  Calgary is an Anglican dean in the Anglican Diocese of Calgary of the Ecclesiastical Province of Rupert's Land, based at Cathedral Church of the Redeemer, Calgary.

Incumbents have been :

References

Anglican Church of Canada deans